Catharine H. Waterman (Waterman; after marriage, Esling; April 12, 1812 - April 6, 1897) was an American author and poet who contributed to the periodical literature. Her publications included books, edited volumes, as well as hymns.

Biography
Catharine (sometimes spelled "Catherine") Harbison Waterman (sometimes spelled "Watterman") was born in Philadelphia, Pennsylvania, April 12, 1812.

Under her maiden name, she became known as an author in various periodicals. Her first published pieces appeared in the New York Mirror and subsequently, the Annuals, Graham's Magazine and Godey's Magazine.

Esling wrote hymns, such as "Come Unto Me", which were published in the annual The Christian Keepsake (1839). She stated that her hymns never would have been published but for her mother. In 1841, she edited a volume, Friendship's Offering for 1842. In 1850, her poems were collected and published under the title, The Broken Bracelet and Other Poems. In her later years, she gave up writing.

In 1840, she married Captain George J. Esling, of her native city, who was serving in the Merchant Marine. She resided in Rio de Janeiro from that date until 1844 after which she returned to Philadelphia. In 1883, after her husband's death in Philadelphia, Esling lived with a daughter. She was a member of the Protestant Episcopal Church in Philadelphia,

Esling died April 6, 1897, in Camden. Interment was at Greenmount Cemetery, Philadelphia. She was survived by three sons.

Selected works

Books
 The Broken Bracelet and Other Poems, 1850
 The Book of parlour games : comprising explanations of the most approved games for the social circle, viz. games of motion, attention, memory, mystification and fun, gallantry and wit, with forfeits, penalities, etc., 1853
 Flora's lexicon : an interpretation of the language and sentiment of flowers : with an outline of botany, and a poetical introduction by Catharine H. Waterman, 1857

Hymns
 "Come sons of Columbia, while proudly and high"
 "Come unto me when shadows darkly gather"
 "Father, a weary heart hath come"

Edited volumes
 Friendship's Offering for 1842, 1841

References

Attribution

External links

 

1812 births
1897 deaths
19th-century American women writers
19th-century American poets
19th-century American Episcopalians
19th-century American women musicians
Writers from Philadelphia
American hymnwriters
American women hymnwriters
American women poets